Tyrannicide is the killing or assassination of a tyrant or unjust ruler, purportedly for the common good,
and usually by one of the tyrant's subjects. Tyrannicide was legally permitted and encouraged in the Classical period. Often, the term tyrant was a justification for political murders by their rivals, but in some exceptional cases students of Platonic philosophy risked their lives against tyrants. The killing of Clearchus of Heraclea by a cohort led by his own court philosopher is considered a sincere tyrannicide. The killers are also called "tyrannicides".

The term originally denoted the action of Harmodius and Aristogeiton, who are often called the Tyrannicides, in killing Hipparchus of Athens in 514 BC.

Political theory

Tyrannicide can also be a political theory and, as an allegedly justified form of the crime of murder, a dilemmatic case in the philosophy of law, and as such dates from antiquity. Support for tyrannicide can be found in Plutarch's Lives, Cicero's De Officiis, and Seneca's Hercules Furens. Plato describes a violent tyrant as the opposite of a good and "true king" in the Statesman, and while Aristotle in the Politics sees it as opposed to all other beneficial forms of government, he also described tyrannicide mainly as an act by those wishing to gain personally from the tyrant's death, while those who act without hope of personal gain or to make a name for themselves are rare.

Various Christian philosophers and theologians also wrote about tyrannicide. In late antiquity, they debated whether the Bible justified tyrannicide. Passages such as the Books of the Maccabees, Daniel 7:27, and Acts 5:29 seemed to justify the practice while others such as Romans 13, Exodus 22:27–28, Proverbs 8:15, and 1 Peter 2:13–18 seemed to condemn it. Theologians were also inspired by rumors of Emperor Julian the Apostate, the final pagan Roman Emperor, being killed by a Christian. During the Middle Ages, most theologians were influenced on the subject by Augustine of Hippo's The City of God, which said that Christians should obey secular authority.

In Thomas Aquinas's commentary on the Sentences of Peter Lombard, Aquinas gave a defense not only of disobedience to an unjust authority, using as an example Christian martyrs in the Roman Empire, but also of "one who liberates his country by killing a tyrant." The Monarchomachs in particular developed a theory of tyrannicide, with Juan de Mariana describing their views in the 1598 work De rege et regis institutione, in which he wrote,  the philosophers and theologians agree, that the prince who seizes the state with force and arms, and with no legal right, no public, civic approval, may be killed by anyone and deprived of his life..."

The Jesuistic casuistry developed a similar theory, criticized by Blaise Pascal in the Provincial Letters. Before them, the scholastic philosopher John of Salisbury also legitimised tyrannicide, under specific conditions, in the Policraticus, circa 1159. His theory was derived from his idea of the state as a political organism in which all the members cooperate actively in the realization of the common utility and justice. He held that when the ruler of this body politic behaves tyrannically, failing to perform his characteristic responsibilities, the other limbs and organs are bound by their duty to the public welfare and God to correct and, ultimately, to slay the tyrant.

In 1408, the theologian Jean Petit used biblical examples to justify tyrannicide following the murder of Louis I, Duke of Orleans by Petit's patron John the Fearless, Duke of Burgundy. Petit's thesis was extensively discussed and eventually anathematized by the church at the Council of Constance. A Shone Treatise of Politike Power, written by John Ponet in 1556, argued that the people are custodians of natural and divine law, and that if governors and kings violated their trust, then they forfeited their power, whether they relinquished their positions voluntarily or whether they had to be removed forcefully. The Tenure of Kings and Magistrates by John Milton in 1649 also described the history of tyrannicide, and a defense of it when appropriate.

Cambridge's David George has also argued that terrorism is a form of tyranny of which tyrannicide is a negation. Abraham Lincoln believed that assassinating a leader is morally justified when a people has suffered under a tyrant for an extended period of time and has exhausted all legal and peaceful means of ouster.

History

Throughout history, many leaders have died under the pretext of tyrannicide. Hipparchus, one of the last Greek leaders to use the title of "tyrant", was assassinated in 514 BC by Harmodius and Aristogeiton, the original tyrannicides. Since then "tyrant" has been a pejorative term, lacking objective criteria. Many rulers and heads of state have been considered tyrannical by their enemies but not by their supporters. For example, when John Wilkes Booth assassinated Abraham Lincoln in 1865, he wrote that he considered Lincoln a tyrant while comparing himself to Marcus Junius Brutus, who stabbed the Roman dictator Julius Caesar in 44 BC. Booth famously shouted "Sic semper tyrannis!" during the assassination.

Tyrannicides have a poor record of achieving their intended outcome. Caesar's death, for example, failed to bring a return to republican power, and instead led to the Roman Empire, but it galvanized later assassins. Several of Caesar's successors (Roman Emperors) came to their demise by assassinations, including Caligula, who was stabbed in 41 by Cassius Chaerea and other Praetorian Guards, and Domitian, stabbed in 96 by a steward of Flavia Domitilla named Stephanus. Many attempts on Commodus's life in the late 2nd century failed, including the one instigated by his own sister Lucilla, but he ultimately fell victim to his own excess by a successful murderous coup. Other emperors assassinated from within include Claudius, Caracalla, Elagabalus, Marcus Aurelius Marius, and Severus Alexander.

After the fall of the Western Roman Empire, tyrannicide continued in the Byzantine Empire when Emperor Andronikos I Komnenos, was tied to a pillar, beaten, and dismembered by a mob in 1185.
Tyrannicide has also been connected to revolution, with many taking place during successful revolutions, and others sparking revolutionary upheavals. In the midst of the French Revolution, Maximilien Robespierre, took power as the President of the National Convention, but after leading the Reign of Terror from 1793 to 1794, he was executed by beheading by the National Convention. The Romanian Revolution, one of the Revolutions of 1989, enabled a group of defected Romanian People's Army soldiers to capture Nicolae Ceauşescu, the country's communist leader, and to stage a trial after which he was executed by a firing squad of paratroopers Ionel Boeru, Georghin Octavian and Dorin-Marian Cirlan.

Many assassins have been killed in the act, such as Rigoberto López Pérez, who shot Nicaraguan dictator Anastasio Somoza García in 1956. Claus von Stauffenberg tried to kill Adolf Hitler on 20 July 1944, was sentenced to death by an impromptu court martial and executed a few hours after the attempted murder. Others were prosecuted for the killing: Antonio de la Maza and his conspirators were executed after their shooting of Rafael Trujillo, dictator of the Dominican Republic in 1961, as was Kim Jaegyu, who shot South Korean dictator Park Chung-hee in 1979. Five of the members of Young Bosnia who were involved with the assassination of Archduke Franz Ferdinand in Sarajevo were sentenced to death by hanging, while eleven were sentenced to various years in prison, including Gavrilo Princip who fired the fatal shot. Khalid Islambouli was one of three members of Egyptian Islamic Jihad executed for the assassination of Anwar Sadat, the autocratic President of Egypt in 1981. Even both Hipparchus's assassins were themselves killed, Harmodius on the spot and Aristogeiton after being tortured, and the major conspirators in the plot to kill Caesar were likewise killed or forced to commit suicide.

Outright revolt was the context for other tyrannicides, and allowed individual killers to escape or remain anonymous. During World War II and the Italian resistance movement, Walter Audisio claimed to have led his team of partisans in the abduction and execution by firing squad of Benito Mussolini in 1945. The circumstances remain clouded, though Audisio was later elected to both the Italian Chamber of Deputies and the Italian Senate. In 1990, Samuel Doe, the President of Liberia was tortured to his death. In 1996, during their takeover of Afghanistan, Taliban soldiers captured Mohammad Najibullah, the President of the Soviet-backed Democratic Republic of Afghanistan, and dragged him to death. Saddam Hussein, President of Iraq was executed in 2006. During the 2011 Libyan civil war, Libyan leader Muammar Gaddafi, the self-titled "Brotherly Leader and Guide of the Revolution", was killed in the Battle of Sirte, in unclear circumstances.

Literature
Tyrannicide is a popular literary trope. Many works of fiction deal with the struggle of an individual or group of individuals to overthrow and kill an unjust tyrant. Often the tyranny is caused by an usurper to a royal throne, where the conclusion restores the proper heir. Children's literature frequently deals with the subject. Folk tales like The Nutcracker include the act, as do some video games series, like The Legend of Zelda and Star Fox. Examples in Disney animation include The Lion King and Aladdin which both involve the tyrannical takeover of a monarchy and its overhaul. Fantasy works like The Chronicles of Narnia, The Brothers Lionheart, A Song of Ice and Fire and science-fiction series like Star Wars and Doctor Who all deal with the killing of tyrants. Besides Julius Caesar, a number of William Shakespeare's plays deal with the subject, including Hamlet, Macbeth, and Richard III. Friedrich Schiller based the play William Tell and the ballad Die Bürgschaft on existing legends of tyrannicide.  The Italian dramatist, poet and philosopher Vittorio Alfieri devoted much of his work to this issue.

See also

 Regicide
 Assassination
 Sic semper tyrannis

References

Bibliography

 
 
 
 
 
 

Murder
Dictatorship
Killings by type